Glendullan distillery is a single malt Scotch whisky distillery in Dufftown, Scotland on the Speyside region. Glendullan is owned by Diageo.

The Distillery
Glendullan distillery was established in 1897.

Production
Glendullan distillery's water source is Conval Hill springs.  There are three wash stills and three spirit stills.

External links
- Description of Glendullan Distillery

Distilleries in Scotland
Glendullan
1897 establishments in Scotland